In mathematics, a (real) Monge–Ampère equation is a nonlinear second-order partial differential equation of special kind. A second-order equation for the unknown function u of two variables x,y is of Monge–Ampère type if it is linear in the determinant of the Hessian matrix of u and in the second-order partial derivatives of u. The independent variables (x,y) vary over a given domain D of R2. The term also applies to analogous equations with n independent variables. The most complete results so far have been obtained when the equation is elliptic.

Monge–Ampère equations frequently arise in differential geometry, for example, in the Weyl and Minkowski problems in differential geometry of surfaces. They were first studied by Gaspard Monge in 1784 and later by André-Marie Ampère in 1820. Important results in the theory of Monge–Ampère equations have been obtained by Sergei Bernstein, Aleksei Pogorelov, Charles Fefferman, and Louis Nirenberg. More recently in 2018 Alessio Figalli won the Fields medal in part for his work on the regularity of the Monge–Ampère equation.

Description 

Given two independent variables x and y, and one dependent variable u, the general Monge–Ampère equation is of the form

where A, B, C, D, and E are functions depending on the first-order variables x, y, u, ux, and uy only.

Rellich's theorem 
Let Ω be a bounded domain in R3, and suppose that on Ω A, B, C, D, and E are continuous functions of x and y only.  Consider the Dirichlet problem to find u so that

If

then the Dirichlet problem has at most two solutions.

Ellipticity results
Suppose now that x is a variable with values in a domain in Rn, and that f(x,u,Du) is a positive function.  Then the Monge–Ampère equation

is a nonlinear elliptic partial differential equation (in the sense that its linearization is elliptic), provided one confines attention to convex solutions.

Accordingly, the operator L satisfies versions of the maximum principle, and in particular solutions to the Dirichlet problem are unique, provided they exist.

Applications
Monge–Ampère equations arise naturally in several problems in Riemannian geometry, conformal geometry, and CR geometry.  One of the simplest of these applications is to the problem of prescribed Gauss curvature.  Suppose that a real-valued function K is specified on a domain Ω in Rn, the problem of prescribed Gauss curvature seeks to identify a hypersurface of Rn+1 as a graph z = u(x) over x ∈ Ω so that at each point of the surface the Gauss curvature is given by K(x).  The resulting partial differential equation is

The Monge–Ampère equations are related to the Monge–Kantorovich optimal mass transportation problem, when the "cost functional" therein is given by the Euclidean distance.

See also
Complex Monge–Ampère equation

References

Additional references

External links
 
 

Partial differential equations